Spree '73, derived from SPiritual REEmphasis, was a major Christian festival held in Earls Court and Wembley Arena, London during August 1973. At its peak at Wembley it was estimated that there was an attendance of over 30,000.

It was organised by the Billy Graham organisation and was addressed by Billy Graham himself.

It featured throughout the Swedish Gospel choir Choralerna from Göteborg and music by Kevin Gould.

The final event in Wembley on August 4 featured Cliff Richard, Johnny Cash, Kevin Gould, June Carter and Carl Perkins.

Its success led to the Billy Graham Organisation organising Eurofest '75 in Brussels.

Evangelical Christian conferences
Religious festivals in the United Kingdom